Meckel syndrome, type 1 also known as MKS1 is a protein that in humans is encoded by the MKS1 gene.

Function 

The MKS1 protein along with meckelin are part of the flagellar apparatus basal body proteome and are required for cilium formation.

Clinical significance 

Mutations in the MKS1 are associated with Meckel syndrome or Bardet–Biedl syndrome.

Model organisms

Model organisms have been used in the study of MKS1 function. A conditional knockout mouse line, called Mks1tm1a(EUCOMM)Wtsi was generated as part of the International Knockout Mouse Consortium program — a high-throughput mutagenesis project to generate and distribute animal models of disease to interested scientists.

Male and female animals underwent a standardized phenotypic screen to determine the effects of deletion. Twenty five tests were carried out on mutant mice and two significant abnormalities were observed. The homozygous mutant embryos identified during gestation had polydactyly, oedema and eye or craniofacial defects. None survived until weaning. The remaining tests were carried out on heterozygous mutant adult mice and no further abnormalities were observed.

References

Further reading

External links
  GeneReviews/NIH/NCBI/UW entry on Bardet-Biedl Syndrome

Genes mutated in mice